Canterbury Fayre 2001 is a 2001 live album by Hawkwind.

Track listing
"5th Second of Forever" (Lloyd-Langton, Brock) – 3:52
"Levitation" (Brock) – 9:18
"Spiral Galaxy" (House) – 3:16
"Solitary Mind Games" (Lloyd-Langton) – 8:08
"Angels of Death" (Brock) – 6:17
"Spirit of the Age" (Calvert, Brock) – 7:35
"Magnu" (Brock) – 3:43
"Dust of Time" [excerpt] (Bainbridge, Brock, Lloyd-Langton) – 2:08
"Motorway City" (Brock) – 6:11
"Hurry on Sundown" (Brock) – 3:44
"Assassins of Allah" [aka "Hassan-i-Sabah" (Calvert, Rudolph) / "Space Is Their (Palestine)" (Brock)] – 12:25
"Silver Machine" (Calvert, Brock) – 5:16
"Arthur's Poem" (Brown) – 0:55
"Assault and Battery" (Brock) – 2:51
"Void of Golden Light" [aka "The Golden Void"] (Brock) – 10:44
"Ejection" (Calvert) – 8:18

Personnel
Hawkwind
Dave Brock - guitar, keyboards, vocals
Simon House - violin
Keith Kniveton - synthesisers
Alan Davey - bass guitar, vocals
Richard Chadwick - drums
Huw Lloyd-Langton - guitar, vocals
Arthur Brown - vocals on "Silver Machine" and "Arthur's Poem"

Credits
Herne Hill, Mount Ephraim Gardens, Music Festival, 18 August 2001

Release
Dec-2002: Voiceprint Records, HAWKVP22CD, UK 2CD

References

Hawkwind live albums
2003 live albums